Alive and Dead is American death metal band Six Feet Under's first EP, released October 29, 1996. The EP compiles a handful of live songs culled from Six Feet Under's debut album, Haunted, and features three new studio tracks, including a cover of Judas Priest's "Grinder."

Track listing

Personnel
Six Feet Under
Chris Barnes - vocals
Allen West - guitar
Terry Butler - bass
Greg Gall - drums

Production
Produced by Brian Slagel and Bill Metroyer
Engineered by Bill Metroyer and Chris Carroll
Mixed by Brian Slagel and Bill Metroyer
Mastered by Eddy Schreyer at Oasis Mastering
Artwork
Cover art and design by Bryan Ames

References

External links
 Six Feet Under's website

1996 EPs
Six Feet Under (band) albums
1996 live albums
Live EPs
Metal Blade Records live albums
Metal Blade Records EPs